Michael René Dunigan (born July 2, 1989) is an American professional basketball player for the Soles de Mexicali of the Liga Nacional de Baloncesto Profesional. He played college basketball at the University of Oregon.

High school career
Dunigan attended Farragut Academy in Chicago, Illinois. As a junior, he averaged 18 points, 13 rebounds and six blocks per game. As a senior, he averaged 20 points, 12 rebounds and five blocks per game. The 2008 McDonald's All-American was rated as one of the top prep centers: No. 3 by ESPN.com, No. 5 by Scout.com and No. 8 by Rivals.com.

Awards and honors
Jordan Brand All-American
Illinois Gatorade Player of the Year
Illinois’ Mr. Basketball Runner-up
Third-team Parade All-American (2008)
Chicago Tribune First Team All-State
Chicago Sun Times All-Area selection
All-Chicago Public League First Team honoree
Chicago Defender's Co-Player of the Year
Associated Press 4A All-State First Team

College career
In his freshman season at Oregon, Dunigan was the team-leader in blocks at 1.0 block per game, ranking him sixth among Pac-10 Conference players. In 29 games (24 starts), he averaged 8.4 points and 4.6 rebounds per game.

In his sophomore season, he ranked fifth in the Pac-10 for blocks at 1.3 blocks per game. In 28 games (21 starts), he averaged 9.0 points and 4.9 rebounds per game.

Professional career

2010–11 season
In September 2010, Dunigan left Oregon, forgoing his junior and senior college years, and signed with Hapoel Migdal Jerusalem of Israel for the 2010–11 season. In November 2010, Dunigan was loaned to BC Kalev/Cramo of Estonia where he played out the rest of the season.

2011–12 season
Following the 2010–11 season, Dunigan entered the 2011 NBA draft, but subsequently went undrafted. In July 2011, he signed with A.S. Junior Pallacanestro Casale of Italy for the 2011–12 season. On November 23, 2011, he left Casale and signed with Dnipro-Azot of the Ukraine for the rest of the season.

2012–13 season
On September 29, 2012, Dunigan signed with the Memphis Grizzlies. However, he was waived by the Grizzlies on October 23.

On December 1, 2012, Dunigan signed with the Perth Wildcats as a temporary replacement for the injured Matthew Knight. On January 5, 2013, he was released by the Wildcats following the return of Knight from injury. Later that month, Dunigan signed with Air21 Express of the Philippine Basketball Association to play in the 2013 Commissioner's Cup. In Dunigan's first game for Air21 Express, he recorded 24 points and 19 rebounds as his team went on to defeat Barangay Ginebra 74–70. In 15 games for Express, Dunigan averaged 23.9ppg, 15.4rpg, 3.3apg, and 2.4bpg.

2013–14 season
Dunigan joined the Miami Heat for the 2013 NBA Summer League. Later that year, he was selected 5th overall in the 2013 KBL draft by the Seoul Samsung Thunders. On January 21, 2014, he was traded to the Wonju Dongbu Promy.

2014–15 season
On November 2, 2014, Dunigan was selected by the Canton Charge with the 12th overall pick in the 2014 NBA D-League draft. In January 2015, he left Canton and signed with Barangay Ginebra San Miguel as an import for the 2015 PBA Commissioner's Cup. He played his final game for Barangay on March 28 before returning to the United States and re-joining the Charge on April 4.

2015–16 season
On September 28, 2015, Dunigan signed with the Cleveland Cavaliers. However, he was later waived by the Cavaliers on October 10. On October 30, he returned to Canton. On November 14, he made his season debut for the Charge in a 106–99 loss to the Maine Red Claws, recording eight points, nine rebounds and one block in 25 minutes. On March 25, 2016, he was waived by the Charge after a sustaining a season-ending injury.

2016–17 season
In November 2016, Dunigan re-joined the Canton Charge.

2017–18 season
On August 23, 2017, Dunigan was selected by the Wisconsin Herd in the NBA G League expansion draft.

2018–19 season
In September 2018, Dunigan signed with Soles de Mexicali of the Mexican Liga Nacional de Baloncesto Profesional.

References

External links
Michael Dunigan at nba.com
Michael Dunigan at foxsportspulse.com

1989 births
Living people
African-American basketball players
Air21 Express players
American expatriate basketball people in Australia
American expatriate basketball people in Estonia
American expatriate basketball people in Israel
American expatriate basketball people in Italy
American expatriate basketball people in Mexico
American expatriate basketball people in the Philippines
American expatriate basketball people in Ukraine
A.S. Junior Pallacanestro Casale players
Barangay Ginebra San Miguel players
Basketball players from Chicago
BC Dnipro-Azot players
BC Kalev/Cramo players
Canton Charge players
Centers (basketball)
Farragut Career Academy alumni
McDonald's High School All-Americans
Oregon Ducks men's basketball players
Parade High School All-Americans (boys' basketball)
Perth Wildcats players
Philippine Basketball Association imports
Soles de Mexicali players
Wisconsin Herd players
American men's basketball players
21st-century African-American sportspeople
20th-century African-American people